The Princess Elizabeth Stakes is a Canadian Thoroughbred horse race run annually at Woodbine Racetrack in Toronto, Ontario. Run in mid October, the stakes race currently offers a purse of CAN$250,000, the richest race of the year for Canadian-foaled two-year-old fillies. It is contested at a distance of  miles on Tapeta synthetic dirt.

Inaugurated in 1946 as a six furlong sprint race at Toronto's Greenwood Raceway, the Princess Elizabeth Stakes was named in honor of Britain's future Queen, the then Princess Elizabeth. Since inception it has been raced at three different distances:
 6 furlongs : 1946–1956 at Greenwood Raceway
 7 furlongs : 1957–1958 at Greenwood Raceway and 1959–1960 at Woodbine Racetrack
 8.5 furlongs : 1961 to present at Woodbine Racetrack

Records
Speed  record: 
 1:43.48 – Ginger Gold (2001) (at current distance of  miles)

Most wins by an owner:
 6 – Sam-Son Farm (1976, 1984, 1986, 1990, 2000, 2006)

Most wins by a jockey:
 3 – Avelino Gomez (1957, 1960, 1964)
 3 – Brian Swatuk (1968, 1978, 1990)
 3 – Sandy Hawley (1970, 1973, 1988)
 3 – Dave Penna (1983, 1985, 1986)
 3 – Mickey Walls (1991, 1993, 1997)

Most wins by a trainer:
 6 – Roger Attfield (1989, 1991, 1993, 1997, 2002, 2016)

Winners of the Princess Elizabeth Stakes

References

 The Princess Elizabeth Stakes at Pedigree Query

Restricted stakes races in Canada
Flat horse races for two-year-old fillies
Recurring sporting events established in 1946
Woodbine Racetrack